Von Schrenck's bittern or Schrenck's bittern (Ixobrychus eurhythmus) is a small bittern (birds of the subfamily Botaurinae). It is named after Leopold von Schrenck, the 19th-century Russian naturalist.

Description
The male is uniformly chestnut above, and buff below and on the wing covert feathers. The female and juvenile are chestnut all over with white speckles above, and white streaks below. When in flight, it shows black flight feathers and tail.

Distribution and habitat

It breeds in China and Siberia from March to July, and Japan from May to August. It winters in Indonesia, the Philippines, Singapore, Laos, passing through the rest of Southeast Asia. It is an exceptionally rare vagrant as far west as Europe, with a single sighting in Italy in 1912.

Behaviour and ecology
Von Schrenck's bittern breeds in reed beds and tends to emerge at dusk to forage for prey.

Conservation
Widespread throughout its large range, Von Schrenck's bittern has been assessed as least concern on the IUCN Red List.

References

External links 

Von Schrenck's bittern
Von Schrenck's bittern
Birds of East Asia
Von Schrenck's bittern